The 2014 Isla Vista killings were a series of misogynistic terror attacks in Isla Vista, California. On the evening of Friday, May 23, 22-year-old Elliot Rodger
killed six people and injured fourteen others—by gunshot, stabbing and vehicle ramming—near the campus of the University of California, Santa Barbara (UCSB), and then killed himself.

Rodger stabbed three men to death in his apartment, apparently one by one on their arrival. About three hours later, he drove to a sorority house and, after failing to get inside, shot three women outside, two of whom died. He next drove past a nearby deli and shot a male student inside to death. He then began to drive through Isla Vista, shooting and wounding several pedestrians from his car and striking several others with his car. He exchanged gunfire with police twice, and he was injured in the hip. After his car crashed into a parked vehicle, he was found dead inside with a self-inflicted gunshot wound to the head.

Before driving to the sorority house, Rodger uploaded a video to YouTube titled "Elliot Rodger's Retribution", in which he outlined his planned attack and his motives. He explained that he wanted to punish women for rejecting him, and sexually active men because he envied them. He also emailed a lengthy autobiographical manuscript to friends, his therapist and family members; the document appeared on the Internet and became widely known as his manifesto. In it, he described his childhood, family conflicts, frustration over his inability to find a girlfriend, his hatred of women, his contempt for couples (particularly interracial couples) and his plans for what he described as "retribution". In February 2020, the International Centre for Counter-Terrorism at the Hague retroactively described the killings as an act of misogynist terrorism. The US Secret Service describes it as "misogynistic extremism."

Attacks 
Elliot Rodger began his attacks at his apartment on Seville Road, where he killed three men by stabbing them multiple times. Bloodstains later found in the building's hallway suggest that Rodger had attacked one or more of his victims as they entered; a bloody bath towel and paper towels in the bathroom suggest Rodger had attempted to clean the hallway. The men's positions suggested that each was killed separately as they entered. Two of the victims were confirmed to be Rodger's roommates according to an apartment lease, while police were investigating whether the third was also a resident or visiting the apartment on the night of the killings.

After the stabbings, Rodger purchased coffee at a coffee shop. At around 8:30 p.m., he was seen working on his laptop in his car in the parking lot of his apartment building. He uploaded his "Retribution" video at 9:17 and sent his manifesto e-mail at 9:18. After receiving a copy of the manifesto, Rodger's therapist phoned his mother, whofinding the "Retribution" video on Rodger's YouTube channelcontacted Rodger's father. In separate cars, his parents left Los Angeles for Santa Barbara, calling Isla Vista police enroute.

Rodger drove to the Alpha Phi sorority house at Embarcadero del Norte and Segovia Road near UCSB, where he knocked on the front door for a few minutes. After no one answered the door, he then began shooting people nearby. Two women were killed and a third was injured. Rodger then began driving again, firing into an unoccupied coffee shop on Pardall Road, then several times into a delicatessen; a man was struck seven times and killed.

Rodger drove south on Embarcadero del Norte on the wrong side of the street, striking a pedestrian and firing at two people on the sidewalk, missing them. He shot a couple exiting a pizzeria and a female cyclist. He drove south on El Embarcadero and shot at and missed a woman, turned east on Del Playa Drive, and made a U-turn to drive west. He then exchanged fire with a sheriff's deputy responding to a telephone report, and struck two pedestrians.

Turning north on Camino del Sur, Rodger shot and wounded three people at Sabado Tarde Street, and struck a skateboarder and two cyclists with his car. Turning east on Sabado Tarde, he struck another skateboarder with his car and shot two other men at the intersection with Camino Pescadero. On Sabado Tarde near Little Acorn Park, Rodger exchanged gunfire with three sheriff's deputies, and was shot in the hip. Pursued by police, he turned south a second time onto El Embarcadero, then west again on Del Playa. He struck a cyclist, then crashed on the north sidewalk just east of the intersection of Del Playa and Camino Pescadero.

At 9:35, police found Rodger dead inside his car from a self-inflicted gunshot wound to his head. In the car were three pistols, knives, six empty ten-round magazines, and 548 rounds of unspent ammunition.

Victims 
All six murder victims were students at UCSB. The men killed at Rodger's apartment were George Chen, 19; Chengyuan "James" Hong, 20; and Weihan "David" Wang, 20. The three who died from gunshot wounds were Katherine Breann Cooper, 22; Christopher Ross Michaels-Martinez, 20; and Veronika Elizabeth Weiss, 19. Cooper and Weiss were the women killed outside the Alpha Phi sorority house, while Michaels-Martinez was the victim inside the Isla Vista Deli Mart.

Fourteen other people were injured; seven from gunshot wounds and seven by blunt trauma sustained when Rodger struck them with his vehicle. Eleven of the injured were taken to hospitals. Seven went to Santa Barbara Cottage Hospital, where two were admitted in serious condition, one in fair condition, and two others in good condition, and one patient was released on the same day. The remaining four injured were taken to Goleta Valley Cottage Hospital, where they were all treated and released.

Aftermath 

Students and community members gathered at Anisq'Oyo Park in Isla Vista on the evening of May 24 for a candlelight memorial to remember the victims. 20,000 people attended a memorial service at UCSB's Harder Stadium on May 27. On May 23, 2015, the first anniversary of the attacks, hundreds of people gathered at UCSB for a candlelight vigil commemorating the six slain victims. The mother of George Chen made a speech at the event.

Following the attacks, some on Twitter used the #NotAllMen hashtag to express that not all men are misogynistic and not all men commit murder. Others criticized use of this hashtag, as it was considered to derail from discussion of the issue of violence against women. Someone created the Twitter hashtag #YesAllWomen on May 24 to express the idea that all women experience misogyny and sexism.

Perpetrator 

Elliot Oliver Robertson Rodger (July 24, 1991 – May 23, 2014) was an English-American former college student, and the sole perpetrator of the 2014 Isla Vista killings.

Early life 
Born in London, England, he moved to the United States with his parents at age five. He was raised in Los Angeles. His father is British filmmaker Peter Rodger, his paternal grandfather photo-journalist George Rodger. His mother is a Malaysian Chinese research assistant for a film company. A younger sister was born before his parents divorced. After Peter remarried, he and his second wife Soumaya Akaaboune, a Moroccan actress with whom Elliot had a strained relationship, had a son together; Elliot's half-brother.

Rodger attended Crespi Carmelite High School, an all-boys Catholic school in Encino, Los Angeles, and then Taft High School in Woodland Hills, which he attended for only a week due to severe bullying. He last attended Independence Continuation High School in Lake Balboa from where he graduated in 2009. Rodger then briefly enrolled in Los Angeles Pierce College and Moorpark College before ultimately transferring to Santa Barbara City College in 2011. Thereafter, he resided in Isla Vista. After his attack, the school said he had not taken any classes since 2012.

Mental health and social problems 
According to his family's attorney and a family friend, Rodger had seen multiple therapists since he was eight years old, but the attorney said he had never been formally diagnosed with a mental illness.  He was diagnosed with pervasive developmental disorder not otherwise specified, an autism spectrum disorder, in 2007.

By the ninth grade, Rodger was "increasingly bullied", and wrote later that he "cried by [himself] at school every day"; at this time he developed an obsession with the multiplayer-online game World of Warcraft, which dominated his life for most of his teenage years, and briefly into his 20s. At Crespi Carmelite High he was bullied; in one incident his head was taped to a desk while he was asleep. According to Rodger, in 2012, "the one friend [he] had in the whole world who truly understood [him]... said he didn't want to be friends anymore" without offering any reason. Rodger had a YouTube account, and a blog titled "Elliot Rodger's Official Blog", through which he expressed loneliness and rejection. He wrote that he had been prescribed risperidone but refused to take it, stating, "After researching this medication, I found that it was the absolute wrong thing for me to take."

After turning 18, Rodger began rejecting mental health care and became increasingly isolated. He said that he was unable to make friends, although acquaintances said that he rebuffed their attempts to be friendly. Family friend Dale Launer said that he counseled Rodger on approaching women, but that Rodger did not follow the advice; Launer also commented that when he met Rodger at eight or nine, "I could see then that there was something wrong with him... looking back now he strikes me as someone who was broken from the moment of conception."

Early incidents 
Rodger claims in his manifesto that in 2011 he threw coffee on a couple he was jealous of; he claims in another incident, he splashed coffee on two girls for not smiling at him. In 2012, Rodger used a Super Soaker filled with orange juice to spray a group playing kickball at Girsh Park.

Referring to an incident in July 2013, Rodger wrote that after being mocked at a party, he tried but failed to shove some girls over a ten-foot ledge; instead, other boys pushed him over and his ankle was injured. When he went back for his sunglasses he was again mocked and beaten. A neighbor saw Rodger come home crying and vowing to kill the men involved and then himself. He wrote in his manifesto that the incident was the final trigger for his planning the attack.

In January 2014, Rodger accused Cheng Yuan Hong, one of his roommates, of stealing some candles; Hong pleaded guilty to petty theft. On April 30, Rodger's parents contacted police after becoming alarmed by his behavior and YouTube videos. Sheriff's deputies who visited Rodger determined that he did not meet the criteria for an involuntary mental health commitment; Rodger had told them he had a "misunderstanding" with his parents.

Manifesto and online posts 
Rodger emailed his 107,000-word manifesto, My Twisted World: The Story of Elliot Rodger, to 34 people, including his therapist, Charles Sophy, his parents and other family, former teachers, and childhood friends. In it he said he had originally sought to carry out an attack on Halloween of 2013, but reconsidered because he thought there would be too many police present.

In his last YouTube video, "Elliot Rodger's Retribution", Rodger complained of being rejected by women and envying sexually active men, and described his planned attack and the motives behind it. In the video, he says:

He wrote in My Twisted World that being of mixed race made him "different from the normal fully white kids". On one online forum, he said that he opposed interracial dating and made several racist posts regarding African-American, South Asian and East Asian people, stating that seeing men of these ethnic groups socializing with white women "makes you want to quit life". In one online post, Rodger wrote:

In his manifesto, Rodger made a racist comment regarding another boy, outlining some of his plans:

A "War on Women" was the second phase of his plan:

Rodger stated in his manifesto that, in his ideal world, he would quarantine all [women] in concentration camps. At these camps, the vast majority of the female population will be deliberately starved to death. That would be an efficient and fitting way to kill them all off... I would have an enormous tower built just for myself... and gleefully watch them all die. He also dreamed of a pure world, [where] the man's mind can develop to greater heights than ever before. Future generations will live their lives free of having to worry about the barbarity of sex and women, which will enable them to expand their intelligence and advance the human race to a state of perfect civilization. He said that he planned to kill his half-brother and stepmother, but was not mentally prepared to kill his father.

Preparations
In September 2012, Rodger visited a shooting range to practice firing handguns. In November, he purchased his first handgun, a Glock 34 pistol, in Goleta, choosing it as "an efficient and highly accurate weapon". In early 2013, Rodger bought two additional handguns, both SIG Sauer P226 pistols, writing that they were "of a much higher quality than the Glock" and "a lot more efficient". He purchased the weapons legally in Oxnard and Burbank, California.

Rodger claimed to have saved at least $6,000, in order to purchase the weapons and supplies for the attacks. Gun law experts in California have said that there was nothing in Rodger's known history that prevented him from making legal firearm purchases.

In regards to the manifesto, Rodger's father was aware that he had been writing prior to the shooting, while being unaware of the subject matter. In a hike prior to the shooting, Rodger's father asked him "'Can I please read it? Can you please just send it to me?", and Rodger replied "Oh, no, no, no. I'll send it to you soon enough."

Responses

Gun control and mental health 
The attacks renewed calls for gun control and improvements in the American health care system, with Connecticut Senator Richard Blumenthal saying,

California Senator Dianne Feinstein blamed the National Rifle Association's "stranglehold" on gun laws for the attack and said "shame on us" in Congress for failing to do something about it. Timothy F. Murphy, a Representative from Pennsylvania and a clinical psychologist, said his bipartisan mental health overhaul would be a solution and urged Congress to pass it.

Richard Martinez, the father of victim Christopher Michaels-Martinez, gave a speech in which he placed the blame of the attacks on "craven, irresponsible" politicians and the National Rifle Association. Martinez later urged the public to join him in "demanding immediate action" from members of Congress regarding gun control. He also expressed his sympathy towards Rodger's parents.

Doris A. Fuller, the executive director of the Treatment Advocacy Center, said that California law permitted emergency psychiatric evaluations of potentially dangerous individuals through provisions, but such actions were never enabled during the initial police investigation of Rodger. She said,

Some California lawmakers called for an investigation into the deputies' contact with Rodger on April 30, at which time the California gun ownership database reflected the fact that Rodger had bought at least two handguns. Deputies did not check the database, nor did they view the YouTube videos that had prompted Rodger's parents to contact them. In September 2014 California legislators in the California State Legislature passed a red flag law to enable judges to have guns seized from persons who are a danger to themselves or to others. It was subsequently signed into law by Governor Jerry Brown.

Misogyny 
The attack sparked discussion of broader issues of violence against women and misogyny. Rodger frequented online forums such as PUAHate and ForeverAlone, where he and other men posted misogynistic statements, and described himself online as an "incel" – a member of an online subculture based around its members' perceived inability to find a romantic or sexual partner. Rodger wrote that after purchasing his first gun he "felt a new sense of power. I was now armed. Who's the alpha male now, bitches? I thought to myself, regarding all of the girls who've looked down on me in the past." He also described his plan to invade a sorority house, writing, "I will slaughter every single spoiled, stuck-up, blond slut I see inside there. All those girls I've desired so much. They have all rejected me and looked down on me as an inferior man." According to the International Centre for Counter-Terrorism at the Hague, these attacks were an act of misogynist terrorism.

Writer M.E. Williams objected to Rodger being labeled the "virgin killer", saying that implies that "one possible cause of male aggression is a lack of female sexual acquiescence". Amanda Hess, writing for Slate, argued that although Rodger killed more men than women, his motivations were misogynistic because his reason for hating the men he attacked was that he thought they stole the women he felt entitled to. Writing for Reason, Cathy Young countered with "that seems like a good example of stretching the concept into meaninglessness – or turning it into unfalsifiable quasi-religious dogma" and wrote that Rodger also wrote many hateful messages about other men.

In Down Girl: The Logic of Misogyny feminist academic Kate Manne analyzed the many arguments presented by Young, Mac Donald, and other media commentators to the effect that Rodger could not have been a misogynist because (among other reasons) he was sexually attracted to women, his hateful rhetoric was ultimately the result of mental illness, Rodger loved his mother and hence did not evince a psychological hatred of all women, and he murdered more men than women as an example of a no true Scotsman fallacy. In contrast to a narrow definition of misogyny requiring generalized hatred of women with few (or no) exceptions, similar to the virulent antisemitism of Nazi Germany, Manne argued that in practice misogynists tend to selectively target women based on real or imagined violations of patriarchal norms, and that an excessively narrow conception of misogyny "threaten[s] to deprive women of a suitable name for a potentially potent problem facing them."

In some incel communities, it is common for posts to glorify violence by self-identified incels. Rodger is the most frequently referenced, with incels often referring to him as their "saint" and sharing memes in which his face has been superimposed onto paintings of Christian icons. Some incels consider him to be the true progenitor of today's online incel communities. It is common to see references to "E.R." in incel forums, and mass violence by incels is regularly referred to as "going E.R." Rodger has been referenced by the perpetrators or suspected perpetrators of several other mass killings. For example, Alek Minassian, who killed 10 and injured 16 in Toronto, Canada, posted on Facebook before the murders: "Private (recruit) Minassian Infantry 00010, wishing to speak to Sgt 4chan please. C23249161. The incel rebellion has already begun! We will overthrow all the Chads and Stacys! All hail the Supreme Gentleman Elliot Rodger!"

Controversy over publication of Rodger's videos and manifesto 
Several news networks limited the use of the "Retribution" video posted by Rodger for fear of triggering copycat crimes. The New Statesman posited that the manifesto may influence a "new generation of 'involuntary celibates'".

Genius.com co-founder Mahbod Moghadam resigned after receiving negative media attention by adding annotations on Genius.com to the manifesto written by Rodger, which he described as "beautifully written". CNN described Moghadam's annotations as "tasteless and creepy", while Genius.com CEO Tom Lehman said in a statement that it "went beyond that into gleeful insensitivity and misogyny."

Depiction in popular culture 
"Holden's Manifesto", an episode of Law & Order: Special Victims Unit, is based on this event.
Elliot Rodger was mentioned several times in the Criminal Minds episode "Alpha Male".
Chanel Miller recounts her experience as a student at UCSB during the event in her 2019 memoir Know My Name.

See also
 List of homicides in California
 List of mass shootings in the United States
List of rampage killers in the United States
Thor Nis Christiansen, a serial killer targeting young women residing in the same area from 1976 to 1977

Notes

References

External links 

 

2014 active shooter incidents in the United States
2014 crimes in California
2014 murders in the United States
Attacks in the United States in 2014
Deaths by firearm in California
Deaths by stabbing in California
Drive-by shootings
History of Santa Barbara County, California
History of women in California
Incel-related violence
Knife attacks
Mass murder in 2014
Mass murder in California
Mass shootings in California
Mass shootings in the United States
Mass stabbings in the United States
Massacres in the United States
Terrorism in the United States
May 2014 crimes in the United States
May 2014 events in the United States
Murder–suicides in California
Race and crime in the United States
Spree shootings in the United States
Stabbing attacks in 2014
Vehicular rampage in the United States
Violence against women in the United States